Northern Ohio may refer to:

A region of Ohio, see Northeast Ohio and Northwest Ohio
Northern Ohio, Arkansas, an unincorporated community